Chacarilla Canton is a canton in the La Paz Department, Bolivia. Its seat is Chacarilla. It had 23 inhabitants at the time of census 2001.

References 

 Instituto Nacional de Estadistica de Bolivia

Cantons of Bolivia
Cantons of La Paz Department (Bolivia)